The 1958 Winnipeg Blue Bombers finished in 1st place in the WIFU division with a 13–3 record. In a rematch of the previous season's Grey Cup Final, the Blue Bombers defeated the Hamilton Tiger-Cats to win the 46th Grey Cup, and their first since 1941.

Preseason

Regular season

Standings

Schedule

Playoffs

Grey Cup

References

Winnipeg Blue Bombers seasons
N. J. Taylor Trophy championship seasons
Grey Cup championship seasons
1958 Canadian Football League season by team